Six-time defending champion Dylan Alcott defeated Sam Schröder in the final, 6–1, 6–0 to win the quad singles wheelchair tennis title at the 2021 Australian Open. It was the first step towards an eventual Golden Slam for Alcott.

For the first time in major history, the draw was increased from four to eight players.

Seeds

Draw

Bracket

References

External links
 Drawsheet on ausopen.com

Wheelchair Quad Singles
2021 Quad Singles